Tagoloan, officially the Municipality of Tagoloan, is a 1st class municipality in the province of Misamis Oriental, Philippines. It is located to the east of Cagayan de Oro and located south-east of Macajalar Bay. According to the 2020 census, it has a population of 80,319 people.

History

World War II 
Imperial Japanese forces of the Kawamura Detachment from Panay began landing on Cagayan de Misamis and Tagoloan on 3 May 1942. The town was liberated on 10 May 1945 after the Allied forces land on Cagayan de Misamis.

Geography

Tagoloan total land area of 7,938 hectares represents 2.24 percent of Misamis Oriental's total area of 354,770 hectares. Among the barangays, Sta Ana is the largest, comprising 37 percent of the municipality's land area. Barangays Rosario, which includes contested areas between Municipality of Tagoloan and Municipality of Malitbog, Bukidnon and Sta Cruz, occupy relatively bigger areas (11.2%) than the other nine barangays.

The land area of Tagoloan is suitable for six major uses, which include protection forest, plantation forest, rice, tree and vine, pasture and cultivated crops. About 2,405 hectares or 30 percent of Tagoloan's total area are suitable for forest uses. Rice land is suitable for 2,199 hectares or about 28 percent, while the cultivation of annual crops are suited for 2,024 hectares or about 25 percent.

Tagoloan River that is located beside Barangay Poblacion is the 13th largest river system in the Philippines.

Climate

Barangays
Tagoloan is politically subdivided into 10 barangays.

Landmarks found here are the following:

 MCT – Mindanao Container Port, located in Casinglot, Tagoloan
 FDC – First Distribution Corporation, located in Sihayun, Tagoloan
 MDC – Mindanao Distribution Center of Fast Services Corporation, located in Natumolan, Tagoloan
 CDC – Cagayan Distribution Center of Fast Services Corporation, located in Casinglot, Tagoloan

Demographics

Religion

Majority or about 80% of the people in Tagoloan are Roman Catholic. The Church of Nuestra Señora de la Candelaria, also known as the Tagoloan Church, is situated beside St. Mary's Academy of Tagoloan and fronting Tagoloan Plaza. The current parish priest is Rev. Fr. Enerio Tacastacas and his assistant vicar is Rev. Fr. Vincente Cervantes. The image commemorates the Presentation of Jesus at the Temple. Its feast is on 2 February.

Economy

Crops
Agriculture plays a major role in Tagoloan's economy especially towards supporting agri-industrialization. But because of its industrialization and urbanization, Tagoloan's agriculture land areas have been permanently diminished.

During the last five years, a sizeable agricultural area was virtually unproductive due to encroachment of industries in prime tillable land.

The major agricultural crops in the area are corn, coconut, mango, peanut, rice, banana, and papaya.

Poultry and livestock
Poultry production, particularly chicken, increased from 70,000 birds in 1995 to 136,542 in 1999, and continuously rose to 226,452 birds in 2002 to 374,000 birds in 2003. The increase in poultry production was mainly due to the advent of broiler contract growing in the area. Multinational companies led by Swift, San Miguel Corporation, and Vitarich contributed to the growth of poultry production.

The cattle population of Tagoloan has decreased from 2,356 heads in 2002 to 1,102 heads in 2003. Carabao, swine, and goat-sheep populations decreased in production due to lack of interest in raising them and the high cost of investment.

Fishery
There are three fishing grounds in Tagoloan, Barangays Baluarte, Sugbongcogon, and Casinglot Macajalar Bay.

References

External links
 [ Philippine Standard Geographic Code]
 Local Governance Performance Management System
 https://web.archive.org/web/20131004104825/http://census.gov.ph/

Municipalities of Misamis Oriental